The LAK-12  is a Lithuanian mid-wing, single-seat, FAI Open Class glider that was designed and produced by Lietuviškos Aviacinės Konstrukcijos (LAK) in Lithuania and later by Sportine Aviacija and Sport Aviation USSR.

Design and development
The LAK-12 was designed in the 1980s as an open class racer.

The aircraft is made from fibreglass, foam and carbon fibre. Its  span foam-core wing employs a Wortmann FX67-K-170 airfoil at the wing root, transitioning to a FX67- K-150 section at the wing tip. The wings feature both double-panel upper surface air brakes and flaps that can be set to -7°, -4°, 0°, +5°, +11° and +15°. Water ballast is  held in the wing leading edges and dumped through a centre-fuselage valve. The landing gear is a single retractable monowheel suspended by an oil/nitrogen oleo, plus a tailskid. The cockpit canopy is of one-piece and forward hinged.

Operational history
According to Sportine Aviacija, the current type certificate holder, 253 were manufactured over a twenty-five year production run.

In April 2018 there were 17 LAK-12s listed on the United States Federal Aviation Administration registry, all single-place and certified in the Experimental - Racing/Exhibition category and three registered with Transport Canada in the Limited Class.

Variants
LAK-12 Lietuva  span open-class sailplane.
LAK-12 Lietuva 2RTwo-seat version of the LAK-12 with tandem cockpit in an extended fuselage.
LAK-12E Experimental  span variant built in 1988 and tested in 1988 and 1989, incorporating boundary control via blowholes on the lower surface. Only one produced.

Aircraft on display 
The sole LAK-12E currently hangs from the ceiling of the Lithuanian Aviation Museum in Kaunas.

Specifications (LAK-12)

See also

References

External links

1980s Lithuanian sailplanes
LAK aircraft
Glider aircraft
Aircraft first flown in 1986